More than one hundred full-length BattleTech or MechWarrior science fiction novels have been published by FASA Corporation and later by ROC, and have been translated into at least fifteen languages. The novels take place in the fictional BattleTech universe of the 31st and 32nd centuries. They  can be considered space opera.

History
The first official BattleTech novel was William H. Keith's Decision at Thunder Rift (1986); the last from FASA was Loren L. Coleman's Endgame (2002) which resolved plot lines and character arcs from many previous works.  Subsequent publications jump ahead chronologically to the 32nd-century MechWarrior: Dark Age setting, beginning with Michael A. Stackpole's Ghost War (2002) and ending with Kevin Killiany's To Ride the Chimera (2008). The 2008 closure of WizKids delayed the release of further novels. Steven Mohan Jr's. A Bonfire of Worlds (2010) was initially advertised with an electronic cover showing a Battletech: Dark Age logo, but the printed version released in 2019 reverted to the more traditional BattleTech nomenclature.

In June 2007, Catalyst Game Labs received the rights to publish both Classic and Dark Age book lines and had scheduled new works to resume in the fall of 2009.  However, the next novel, Embers of War, was not released until 2015, with 5 novels total published by February, 2019, and a semi-regular release schedule resuming that year. Several novellas associated with Kickstarter have also been produced for both the Table Top game Battletech and the turn-based strategy game, titled simply BattleTech, by Harebrained Schemes.

BattleTech novels
The following novels occur during what was referred to the "Classic BattleTech" era, which includes the 31st century and preceding centuries. Also, additional eras have been added, broadening the term. The Classic reference was dropped after the ownership change and rebranding occurred.

MechWarrior: Dark Age novels
The following novels occur during the era of MechWarrior: Dark Age in the early to mid 32nd century.

German-language novels

References

See also

 
BattleTech
Mecha in literature
Military science fiction novels